Karl C. Schaub (December 12, 1869 – January 31, 1959) was a Swiss-born American architect who designed many buildings in the state of Utah, including the NRHP-listed Hyrum First Ward Meetinghouse and Old Main in Logan. He was the co-partner of Schaub and Monson with Joseph Monson for eight years. He also served as a bishop of the Church of Jesus Christ of Latter-day Saints.

Works include:
Old Main, Utah State University (1902), Utah State University campus, Logan, UT (Carl S. Schaub), NRHP-listed  Schaub revised, re-drew plans by architect Thompson used in 1890 start of construction 
Hyrum First Ward Meetinghouse (1903), 290 S. Center St., Hyrum, UT (Schaub, Karl C.), NRHP-listed
Logan LDS Sixth Ward Church (1907), 395 S. Main St., Logan, UT (Schaub, K.C.), NRHP-listed
David Eccles House (1907), 250 W. Center St., Logan, UT (Schaub, Karl C.), NRHP-listed
Elite Hall (1917), 98 W. Main St., Hyrum, UT (Schaub, K.C.), NRHP-listed
Lewiston Community Building, 29 S. Main St., Lewiston, UT (Schaub, Karl C.), NRHP-listed
McCune School of Music (Alfred & Elizabeth McCune Mansion, National Register listed in 1974)
Thomas Kearns Mansion (National Register listed in 1970)

References

1869 births
1959 deaths
Swiss emigrants to the United States
People from Graubünden
People from Logan, Utah
Brigham Young University alumni
Utah State University alumni
Architects from Utah
20th-century American architects